Leftrarú and Guacolda are a pair of supercomputers manufactured by Hewlett-Packard (currently Hewlett Packard Enterprise) and Dell EMC respectively, and installed at the National Laboratory of High Performance Computing (NLHPC), in the Center for Mathematical Modeling of the University of Chile, being in set the most powerful supercomputer in Chile, and one of the three most powerful in South America. It is intended for the high-performance computing needs for the various scientific and academic organizations in the country.

Them are named in honor of Lautaro (the Mapuche military leader) and Guacolda (the Lautaro's wife according to the mapuche mythology).

History 
The Center for Mathematical Modeling of the University of Chile, together with other universities, proposed to CONICYT in 2010 the creation of the National Laboratory for High Performance Computing (NLHPC), which would be dedicated to research through supercomputing.

In 2014, the Leftrarú supercomputer has been inaugurated, built with nodes provided by Hewlett-Packard, providing a theoretical performance of 50 teraflops in the beginnings, and currently performing at 70 teraflops. In January 2020, Guacolda joins, whose hardware is provided by Dell EMC, delivering a theoretical performance of 196 teraflops.

Technical specifications 
At the time of the inauguration of Guacolda, the joint supercomputer has 5,236 cores and 266 TFLOPS (theorycal). It is composed of Hewlett-Packard SL200 series and Dell EMC PowerEdge C6420 and R740 series nodes.

Leftrarú

Guacolda

Affiliated organizations 

 University of Chile
 Pontifical Catholic University of Chile
 University of Santiago, Chile
 Austral University of Chile
 Catholic University of the North
 University of La Frontera
 University of La Serena
 University of Talca
 University of the Bío Bío
 Federico Santa María Technical University
 AURA observatory
 Centro Interdisciplinario de Neurociencia de Valparaíso
 Ciencia y Vida foundation
 Inria Chile

References

External links 
 Official website

Science and technology in Chile